Johnny Laws (born January 12, 1943) is an American Chicago blues guitarist, singer and songwriter. A regular performer for over half a century in Chicago's South Side clubs, Laws has released two albums, including Burnin' in My Soul, of which Blues & Rhythm magazine in November 1999 noted, "It's a real shame that Johnny Laws has been unjustly ignored in the past... This is an enjoyable CD... Full marks to those folks at Electro-Fi."

His version of McKinley Mitchell's "End of the Rainbow" demonstrates his versatility and vocal range.

In an April 1999 editorial leader, the Toronto Star remarked that "South Side Chicago fave Johnny Laws... [is] winning plaudits for his seductive, soul-drenched blues."

Life and career
Laws was born in Chicago, Illinois, and has remained there all his life. He has played and performed on the South Side of Chicago since the mid-1960s, remaining largely a local cult favorite for decades. He learned his Chicago blues craft mainly from listening to Jimmy Reed and Buster Benton. His aching falsetto voice and vast repertoire gained much local acclaim. His style ranges from soul to postwar blues to, occasionally, country music. In addition to a regular weekend slot at the Cuddle Inn, Laws has been a frequent performer at the annual Chicago Blues Festival, including a set in 2000. Laws was featured in a 1993 issue of Living Blues magazine.

Laws released his debut album, My Little Girl, for Wolf Records in 1995. The album contains a couple of blues standards, but most of the songs were written by Laws.

His second album, Blues Burnin' in My Soul, was released on Electro-Fi Records in 1999, containing cover versions of Junior Wells's song "Little by Little"; "Steal Away", by Jimmy Hughes; "Honest I Do" and "Ain't That Lovin' You Baby", by Jimmy Reed; and "Sadie", written and originally recorded by Hound Dog Taylor. The autumn 1999 issue of Juke Blues stated that "Johnny Laws has a smooth, silky voice, at times almost a whisper, then rising into a falsetto, and falling back again into gentle expressiveness... His appeal is in a delivery that seems so deceptively effortless."

Discography

Albums

See also
List of Chicago blues musicians
List of electric blues musicians

References

1943 births
Living people
American blues guitarists
American male guitarists
American blues singers
20th-century African-American male singers
Chicago blues musicians
Electric blues musicians
20th-century American singers
20th-century American guitarists
Songwriters from Illinois
Guitarists from Chicago
20th-century American male singers
African-American songwriters
African-American guitarists
21st-century African-American people
American male songwriters